Endeodes collaris is a species of soft-winged flower beetle in the family Melyridae. It is found in North America.

References

Further reading

 

Melyridae
Articles created by Qbugbot
Beetles described in 1853